Raging Stallion Studios based in San Francisco, is a major adult film studio and one of the world's largest producers of gay pornography. It was begun by Chris Ward and J. D. Slater; Michael Brandon later became a co-owner.

In 2005, Raging Stallion released 22 new feature films. In 2009, Raging Stallion merged with AEBN/NakedSword.com. AEBN then purchased Falcon Studios in 2010.

RSS have has taken inspiration from pop culture for more than one of its movies.

In 2018 it started producing bareback movies. Questions have been raised about the risks for the health of the actors and the messaging of showing  bareback sex.

Awards
 2010 XBIZ Award – Gay Movie of the Year (Focus/Refocus) 
 2011 XBIZ Award – Gay Movie of the Year (Brutal)

See also
CzechBoys

References

External links
 
 

American gay pornographic film studios
Pornography in San Francisco
Entertainment companies based in California
Companies based in San Francisco
American companies established in 1998
Entertainment companies established in 1998
Mass media companies established in 1998
1998 establishments in California
Cinema of the San Francisco Bay Area
Gay male pornography websites